The 2013 National Women Football Championship was the 9th season of the National Women Football Championship, the top-tier of women's football in Pakistan. The tournament ran from 4 to 9 December 2013 in Lahore.

Young Rising Stars were able to defend their title and win their fourth consecutive (fifth overall) National Championship by beating Balochistan United 3-2 on penalties in the final, after the match had ended goalless.

Teams
The following eight teams (out of a total of 16) made it to the knock-out stage of the tournament:

 Balochistan United
 Diya
 Higher Education Commission
 Islamabad
 Pakistan Army
 Punjab
 WAPDA
 Young Rising Stars

References

2013 in Pakistani women's sport
2013 in Pakistani sport
2013 in Pakistan
2010s in Lahore
National Women Football Championship seasons